The European Commission of Human Rights was a special body of the Council of Europe.
From 1954 to the 1998 entry into force of Protocol 11 to the European Convention on Human Rights, individuals did not have direct access to the European Court of Human Rights; they had to apply to the commission, which if it found the case to be well-founded would launch a case in the Court on the individual's behalf. Protocol 11 which came into force in 1998 abolished the commission, enlarged the Court, and allowed individuals to take cases directly to it.

Role and formation

Commission members were elected by the Committee of Ministers and would hold office for six years (during which time they were to act independently, without allegiance to any state). Their role was to consider if a petition was admissible to the Court. If so, the Commission would examine the petition to determine the facts of the case and look for parties that could help settle the case in a friendly manner. If a friendly settlement could not take place, the Commission would issue a report on the established facts with an opinion on whether or not a violation had occurred. A Committee of three people determined the admissibility of a petition. For difficult decisions, however, a Chamber consisting of seven people handled it.

List of cases
Greek case
W.P. v. United Kingdom
Jagmail Singh Cheema v. France
Dehwari v. The Netherlands
Berke v. France
Hatami v. Sweden
Dabhi v. United Kingdom
M.A.R. v. United Kingdom
George Ganchev v. Bulgaria
Slepcik v. The Netherlands
Choudry v. United Kingdom
Harron and Alayo v. Sweden
Paez v. Sweden

References 
 Arthur W. Diamond Law Library The European Human Rights System and the European Court of Human Rights. Research Guide
Full list of members (pp. 211–213)
Intergovernmental human rights organizations
Commission of Human Rights
European Convention on Human Rights
European Commission of Human Rights
Hudoc : European Court of HUman Rights website